River of Fire may refer to:

Literature
 Le Fleuve de feu (The River of Fire, tr. 1954), 1923 French novel by François Mauriac
 Aag Ka Darya, English title of the 1959 landmark historical novel by Qurratulain Hyder
 River of Fire, a 1993 novel in the Stormrider series by Victor Milán with the pen name Robert Baron
 River of Fire, a 1996 novel in the Fallen Angels series by Mary Jo Putney
 River of Fire, River of Water, 1998 book on Buddhism by Taitetsu Unno
 River of Fire: The Clydebank Blitz, 2010 book by John Macleod about the World War II Clydebank Blitz bombing raids on Clydebank, Scotland
 River of Fire and Other Stories, 2012 English translation of short stories by Korean writer Oh Jung-hee
 River of Fire, a 2018 novel in the Warriors: A Vision of Shadows series by Erin Hunter
 River of Fire: The Rattlesnake Fire and the Mission Boys, a 2018 book about the 1953 Rattlesnake Fire in northern California by John Maclean
 River of Fire: My Spiritual Journey, a 2019 memoir by Helen Prejean

Film and television
 Aag Ka Dariya (English: River of Fire), a 1953 Indian Hindi-language film directed by Roop K. Shorey
 River of Fire, the third chapter in the 1941 American film serial Jungle Girl
 River of Fire, the first chapter in the 1951 American film serial Government Agents vs. Phantom Legion
 Bor Plerng Tee Pho Talee (English: River of Fire), a 1990 Thai film directed by Panna Rittikrai
 "River of Fire", a season 2 episode of Chūka Ichiban!

Music
 "River of Fire", by Bif Naked from The Promise (2009)
 River of Fire, 1983 chamber music by Brian Cherney
 "River of Fire", a song by In This Moment from Ritual (2017)
 "River of Fire", 1992 single by Stan Meissner

See also
 Ndocciata, a Christmas festival in Molise, southern Italy, with a parade of burning torches
 Phlegethon, a river in the ancient Greek underworld, sometimes translated as the "river of fire"
 Richibucto River, (lit. "river of fire" in the Mi'kmaq language) a river in eastern New Brunswick, Canada
 River fire (disambiguation)